"The Celts" is a song by the Irish musician Enya, from her 1987 album Enya. It originally served as the B-side to the single "I Want Tomorrow", released in 1987. When the album was re-issued in 1992 and re-titled The Celts, the title song was released as an accompanying single, peaking at number 29 in the UK.

Sung entirely in Irish, it was the theme song to the 1986 BBC documentary The Celts and Channel 4's Gaelic Games coverage. The video for the song was filmed at Bodiam Castle. The B-side of the single, "Eclipse", is the song "Deireadh An Tuath" (found on Enya/The Celts album), played backwards.

Charts

References

External links
 

Enya songs
1986 songs
1992 singles
Songs with lyrics by Roma Ryan
Songs with music by Enya
Warner Music Group singles